Tetrasphaera jenkinsii is a bacterium species from the genus Tetrasphaera which has been isolated from activated sludge from Glenelg in Australia.

References 

Intrasporangiaceae
Bacteria described in 2006